Joe Ma Tak-chung (Jyutping: maa5 dak1 zung1; born 27 June 1968) is a Hong Kong TVB actor. He was a policeman before he joined the Hong Kong entertainment industry in 1993. He was a member of the elite G4.

Ma is one of a few Hong Kong actors who are former members of Hong Kong discipline or colonial services.

Filmography

Films
 Defiance (2019)
 Line Walker 2: Invisible Spy (2019)
 Bye! Mr. Wang (2019)
 Out of Inferno (2013)
 72 Tenants of Prosperity (2010)
 Night Security Guard (2003)
 Taxi Driver (2002)
 Cop Shop Babes (2001)
 Tough Cop Inside (2001)
 Clean My Name, Mr. Coroner! (2000)
 Desirous Express (2000)
 Home for a Villain (2000)
 The Hong Kong happy man 2 (2000)	
 The Hong Kong happy man (2000)	
 Killers from Beijing (2000)
 Marooned (2000)
 Point of No Return (2000)
 Untouchable Maniac (2000)
 Body Weapon (1999)
 The Evil of a Woman Heart (1999)
 The House of No Man (1999)
 My Heart Will Go On (1999)
 Unexpectable Killing (1999)
 The Victim (1999)
 Raped by an Angel 2: The Uniform Fan (1998)
 Step into the Dark (1998)
 Till Death Do Us Part (1998)
 A True Mob Story (1998)
 How to Meet the Lucky Stars (1996)
 Lost and Found (1996)

TV dramas

Awards

2018
 TVB Anniversary Award for Best Actor (Life on the Line) 
 People's Choice Television Award for Best Actor  (Life on the Line)

References

External links
  0530865]
 HK cinemagic entry

1968 births
Hong Kong male film actors
Hong Kong police officers
Hong Kong male television actors
Living people
TVB veteran actors
20th-century Hong Kong male actors
21st-century Hong Kong male actors